For the figure in the Profumo political scandal, see Mandy Rice-Davies.

Mandy Davies (born 29 September 1966) is a British former field hockey player who competed in the 1996 Summer Olympics.

References

External links
 

1966 births
Living people
British female field hockey players
Olympic field hockey players of Great Britain
Field hockey players at the 1996 Summer Olympics